Adams Township is one of the twelve townships of Defiance County, Ohio, United States. The 2010 census found 947 people in the township.

Geography
Located in the northeastern corner of the county, it borders the following townships:
Ridgeville Township, Henry County - north
Freedom Township, Henry County - northeast corner
Napoleon Township, Henry County - east
Flatrock Township, Henry County - southeast corner
Richland Township - south
Noble Township - southwest corner
Tiffin Township - west
Springfield Township, Williams County - northwest corner

No municipalities are located in Adams Township.

Name and history
Adams Township was organized in 1836, and named for Judge Bishop Adams, a pioneer settler. It is one of ten Adams Townships statewide.

Government
The township is governed by a three-member board of trustees, who are elected in November of odd-numbered years to a four-year term beginning on the following January 1. Two are elected in the year after the presidential election and one is elected in the year before it. There is also an elected township fiscal officer, who serves a four-year term beginning on April 1 of the year after the election, which is held in November of the year before the presidential election. Vacancies in the fiscal officership or on the board of trustees are filled by the remaining trustees.

Transportation
The most significant highway in Adams Township is U.S. Route 24, which travels from northeast to southwest in the southeastern corner of the township.

References

External links
County website

Townships in Defiance County, Ohio
Townships in Ohio